Badbury as a may refer to one of the following places in England:

Badbury (hundred), Dorset
Badbury Hill, Oxfordshire
Badbury Rings, Dorset
Badbury, Wiltshire